Kulovo may refer to:

Kulovo, Ryazan Oblast, a village in Ryazan Oblast, Russia
Kulovo, Tver Oblast, a village in Tver Oblast, Russia